WTHD 105.5 FM is a radio station broadcasting a country music format. Licensed to LaGrange, Indiana, the station serves the areas of Sturgis, Michigan and Kendallville, Indiana, and is owned by Swick Broadcasting Company, Inc.

The current WTHD airstaff consists of morning show host Jeremy Robinson (6 am to 10 am) and News Director, Mike Stiles.

References

External links
WTHD's official website

THD
Radio stations established in 1975